Lady in the Death House is a 1944 American film directed by Steve Sekely and starring Jean Parker and Lionel Atwill.

Plot 
Mary Kirk Logan is led from her cell to the electric chair, to be "killed by the hand of the man I love."

A psychologist and criminologist, Charles Finch, tells her story. They first meet in a bar when Mary's dress catches fire. Dr. Bradford, having drinks with Finch, helps extinguish the fire. He takes Mary home and they fall in love.

Bradford is a scientist who hopes to develop a way to revive dead tissue. He works as an executioner for the state. Mary won't marry him unless he quits this profession.

A blackmailer is killed in Mary's apartment and she is arrested and tried. Her teenaged sister Suzy is the key to the case. Finch gets her to identify the real killer, but a race against time begins to find the governor so he can stop the execution. Bradford holds off the warden and guards until Finch can save the day.

Cast 
Jean Parker as Mary Kirk Logan
Lionel Atwill as Charles Finch
Douglas Fowley as Dr. Dwight 'Brad' Bradford
Marcia Mae Jones as Suzy Kirk Logan
Robert Middlemass as State's Attorney
Cy Kendall as Detective
John Maxwell as Robert Snell
George Irving as Gregory
Forrest Taylor as Warden
Sam Flint as Governor Harrison
Dick Curtis as Willis Millen

External links 

1944 films
American black-and-white films
1944 romantic drama films
1944 crime drama films
Producers Releasing Corporation films
Films directed by Steve Sekely
American crime drama films
American romantic drama films
1940s English-language films
1940s American films